Thornton is a census-designated place (CDP) in San Joaquin County, California, United States. Thornton has a post office with ZIP code 95686.

History
The railroad was extended to Thornton in 1907. A post office called Thornton has been in operation since 1910. The community was named for Arthur Thornton, the original owner of the town site.

Geography
According to the United States Census Bureau, the CDP covers an area of 2.2 square miles (5.6 km), 98.70% of it land, and 1.30% of it water.

Demographics
At the 2010 census Thornton had a population of 1,131. The racial makeup of Thornton was 554 (49.0%) White, 43 (3.8%) African American, 3 (0.3%) Native American, 45 (4.0%) Asian, 1 (0.1%) Pacific Islander, 443 (39.2%) from other races, and 42 (3.7%) from two or more races. Hispanic or Latino of any race were 770 people (68.1%).

The whole population lived in households, no one lived in non-institutionalized group quarters and no one was institutionalized.

There were 310 households, 166 (53.5%) had children under the age of 18 living in them, 175 (56.5%) were opposite-sex married couples living together, 58 (18.7%) had a female householder with no husband present, 15 (4.8%) had a male householder with no wife present.  There were 17 (5.5%) unmarried opposite-sex partnerships, and 5 (1.6%) same-sex married couples or partnerships. 45 households (14.5%) were one person and 21 (6.8%) had someone living alone who was 65 or older. The average household size was 3.65.  There were 248 families (80.0% of households); the average family size was 4.10.

The age distribution was 404 people (35.7%) under the age of 18, 112 people (9.9%) aged 18 to 24, 259 people (22.9%) aged 25 to 44, 259 people (22.9%) aged 45 to 64, and 97 people (8.6%) who were 65 or older.  The median age was 28.6 years. For every 100 females, there were 95.0 males.  For every 100 females age 18 and over, there were 89.8 males.

There were 326 housing units at an average density of 151.3 per square mile, of the occupied units 134 (43.2%) were owner-occupied and 176 (56.8%) were rented. The homeowner vacancy rate was 0.7%; the rental vacancy rate was 3.8%.  426 people (37.7% of the population) lived in owner-occupied housing units and 705 people (62.3%) lived in rental housing units.

References

Census-designated places in San Joaquin County, California
Census-designated places in California